Norton is a suburb and council ward in the town of Stourbridge, West Midlands. It has a population of 11,943 in an area of 569 hectares. The population is largely White British and self-identifies as predominantly Christian.

History
The area now known as Norton originally fell within the parish of Oldswinford before becoming part of the Municipal Borough of Stourbridge. This was then subsumed into Dudley Metropolitan Borough in 1974. It now borders Stourbridge Town, Wollaston, South Staffordshire, West Hagley, Pedmore, Iverley and Oldswinford.

Governance
Norton ward extends from Love Lane (only the parks side of Love Lane is in Norton; the opposite side is Oldswinford) in Oldswinford along Heath Road and South Road, then left across Roman Road all the way to Norton Road. The boundary follows the built-up area around Racecourse Farm (Racecourse Farm is in Pedmore and in the parish of St Peters along with Racecourse Lane and Fairways Avenue).  The golf course is built on Pedmore Common, not Norton; Quarry Park Rd and surrounding roads are built on Pedmore Quarry, not Norton) along with Norton Road and Worcester Road along the borders of West Hagley (it borders Pedmore, not West Hagley).

It comes under the parliamentary constituency of Stourbridge, whose Member of Parliament is Margot James (Conservative).

Amenities
The area features Mary Stevens Park, one of five staffed parks in the borough, which features a large lake, sports facilities, outdoor gym and children's recreation areas. The park is a designated "healthy hub" within Dudley.

The area also includes Norton Covert, a former sand and gravel pit which produced building sand and aggregate during the 19th century. It is now a designated Site of Importance for Nature Conservation (SINC) for geology and is owned and managed by Dudley Council.

Places of worship
 St Michael & All Angels, Maynard Avenue
 Gig Mill Methodist Church, Glebe Lane

Schools
 Gig Mill Primary School
 St Joseph's Roman Catholic Primary School
 Elmfield Rudolf Steiner School

Other
 Stourbridge Golf Club (though some say it's in Pedmore, as its on Pedmore common)

References

Areas of Dudley
Stourbridge